Tachinus is a genus of crab-like rove beetles in the family Staphylinidae. There are at least 120 described species in Tachinus.

See also
 List of Tachinus species

References

Further reading

External links
 

Tachyporinae